School Spirits is an American supernatural teen drama television series created by Megan Trinrud and Nate Trinrud that premiered on Paramount+ on March 9, 2023. The series, adapted from the forthcoming graphic novel by the Trinruds and Maria Nguyen, stars Peyton List, Kristian Flores, Milo Manheim, and Spencer Macpherson.

Summary 
Maddie is a teen girl stuck in the afterlife investigating her own mysterious disappearance; she goes on a crime-solving journey as she adjusts to high school in the afterlife, but the closer she gets to the truth, the more secrets and lies she discovers.

Cast

Main 
 Peyton List as Maddie Nears
 Kristian Flores as Simon Elroy
 Milo Manheim as Wally Clark (killed in a football tackle at the homecoming game his senior year)
 Spencer MacPherson as Xavier Baxter
 Kiara Pichardo as Nicole Herrera
 Sarah Yarkin as Rhonda (killed by school counselor)
 Nick Pugliese as Charley (died when he forgot his EpiPen on the same day the school cafeteria cooked their French fries in peanut oil)
 Rainbow Wedell as Claire Zolinski

Recurring
 Josh Zuckerman as Mr. Martin
 Maria Dizzia as Sandra Nears

Episodes

Reception 
The review aggregator website Rotten Tomatoes reported an 80% approval rating with an average rating of 6.9/10, based on 15 critic reviews. The website's critics consensus reads, "School Spirits leaves some of its promising potential untapped, but Peyton List's splendid starring performance makes this paranormal mystery a solid watch for anyone who remembers the phantom pain of growing up."

Daniel D'Addario of Variety wrote, "Without losing sight of the sorrow of Maddie's story, School Spirits manages to be surprisingly sparky and fun—proof positive that there are new stories to tell about the institution no one would ever want to be stuck in for their entire afterlife. Daniel Fienberg of The Hollywood Reporter said, "Sometimes the familiar trappings of the high-school genre can open the door for a show to do wilder and more inventive things than more allegedly mature shows. School Spirits, unfortunately, takes no such liberties."

References

External links 

2020s American drama television series
2020s American supernatural television series
2020s American teen drama television series
2023 American television series debuts
Awesomeness (company)
English-language television shows
Paramount+ original programming
Murder in television
Television series about ghosts
Television series about teenagers
Television shows based on comics
Television shows filmed in Vancouver